Clarice Morant (August 29, 1904 – June 10, 2009), also known as Classie, was an American centenarian from Washington, D.C., who gained national media attention for her role as caregiver to Rozzie Laney, Morant's younger sister diagnosed with Alzheimer's disease, and Ira Barber, Morant's younger brother diagnosed with dementia and suffering the aftereffects of a disabling stroke.

References

External links
 "No Greater Love", photo gallery accompanied by audio track, The Washington Post
 "Sweet Dreams", photo gallery accompanied by audio track, The Washington Post

1904 births
2009 deaths
American centenarians
People from Baltimore
People from Washington, D.C.
African-American centenarians
Women centenarians